There are four deep cerebellar nuclei embedded in the white matter of the medullary centre. The nuclei are the fastigial, globose, emboliform, and dentate nuclei.

Inputs
These nuclei receive inhibitory (GABAergic) inputs from Purkinje cells in the cerebellar cortex and excitatory (glutamatergic) inputs from mossy fiber and climbing fiber pathways. Most output fibers of the cerebellum originate from these nuclei. One exception is that fibers from the flocculonodular lobe synapse directly on vestibular nuclei without first passing through the deep cerebellar nuclei. The vestibular nuclei in the brainstem are analogous structures to the deep nuclei, since they receive both mossy fiber and Purkinje cell inputs.

Specific nuclei
From lateral to medial, the four deep cerebellar nuclei are the dentate, emboliform, globose, and  fastigial. Some animals, including humans, do not have distinct emboliform and globose nuclei, instead having a single, fused interposed nucleus. In animals with distinct emboliform and globose nuclei, the term interposed nucleus is often used to refer collectively to these two nuclei.

Topography
In general, each pair of deep nuclei is associated with a corresponding region of cerebellar surface anatomy. 

 The dentate nuclei are deep within the lateral hemispheres, 
 the interposed nuclei are located in the paravermal (intermediate) zone, 
 and the fastigial nuclei are in the vermis.

These structural relationships are generally maintained in the neuronal connections between the nuclei and associated cerebellar cortex, 
 with the dentate nucleus receiving most of its connections from the lateral hemispheres, 
 the interposed nuclei receiving inputs mostly from the paravermis, 
 and the fastigial nucleus receiving primarily afferents from the vermis.

References

.

External links
 
 https://web.archive.org/web/20150621011739/http://www.mona.uwi.edu/fpas/courses/physiology/neurophysiology/Cerebellum.htm

Cerebellum